Ngô Hoàng Thịnh (born April 21, 1992 in Nghệ An) is a Vietnamese footballer who plays as a midfielder for Vietnamese club and the Vietnamese national team. He has captained Vietnam youth sides in numerous occasions.

Hoang Thinh was nominated for the title of Best Young Player of Vietnam Football Federation 4 times in a row but never actually won. He has won many trophies with Sông Lam Nghệ An at youth national tournaments level including: U11, U12, U15, U17, U21. In 2011, at the age of 19, he won the V-League and the Vietnamese National Cup runners-up title with Sông Lam Nghệ An.

Club career

FLC Thanh Hóa
Hoang Thinh signed a 3-year deal with FLC Thanh Hóa in November 2015.

International career
On 15 September 2014, Vietnam beat Iran 4-1 in shock win in the men's football event of the 2014 Asian Games. Considered the underdogs in this clash, Vietnam U23 stun the tournament favourite as Hoang Thinh, the captain scored an indirect free-kick late in the game.

International goals
Scores and results list Vietnam's goal tally first.

Under-19

Under-21

Under-23

Vietnam
Scores and results list Vietnam's goal tally first.

Honours
Sông Lam Nghệ An 
V.League 1: 2011
Vietnamese National Cup: Runner-up 2011
FLC Thanh Hóa 
V.League 1: Runner-up: 2017, 2018
Vietnamese National Cup: Runner-up 2018
Hồ Chí Minh City
V.League 1: Runner-up: 2020
Vietnamese Super Cup: Runner-up: 2020
Vietnam U19
International U-21 Thanh Niên Newspaper Cup: 2010
International U-21 Thanh Niên Newspaper Cup: Runner-up 2009
Vietnam U21
International U-21 Thanh Niên Newspaper Cup: 2011
International U-21 Thanh Niên Newspaper Cup: Runner-up 2012
Vietnam U23
VFF Cup: Runner-up 2011
BTV Cup: Runner-up 2013

References

External links
 
 

Living people
1992 births
Vietnam international footballers
Vietnamese footballers
V.League 1 players
Song Lam Nghe An FC players
Association football midfielders
Footballers at the 2014 Asian Games
People from Nghệ An province
Asian Games competitors for Vietnam